Lynx Central Station is an intermodal transit station in Orlando, Florida. It serves the Lynx bus system and SunRail commuter rail, and is home to Lynx's administrative offices.

It is located near the federal and Orange County Courthouse, the Amway Center and FAMU College of Law. Additionally it provides access to downtown Orlando's businesses, shopping, entertainment and recreational venues.

Bus station

The current bus terminal at Lynx Central Station opened in 2004. It is the central hub of the Lynx network, servicing nearly 30 separate bus routes. The  terminal has an air-conditioned waiting area, with access to the zero-fare Lymmo bus (Orange Line) in Downtown Orlando.

SunRail station

The station is one of two SunRail commuter rail stations serving downtown Orlando, the other being Church Street Station. It provides easy transfer for SunRail commuters to the nearly 30 Lynx bus routes at the station. It will also be the hub for any future expansion of the SunRail system. The station is located along the former CSX A-Line (originally constructed by the South Florida Railroad) and is typical of most SunRail stations featuring canopies consisting of white aluminum poles supporting sloped green roofs and includes ticket vending machines, ticket validators, emergency call boxes, drinking fountains, and separate platforms designed for passengers in wheelchairs. A transit-oriented development called Crescent Central Station is located adjacent to the station and features a 280-unit, multi-story luxury apartment community along with 14,600 square feet of retail space.

References

External links

LYNX Central Station (SunRail)

Transportation in Orlando, Florida
Bus stations in Florida
SunRail stations
2004 establishments in Florida
Transportation buildings and structures in Orange County, Florida